Gillian Freeman (5 December 1929 – 23 February 2019) was an English writer. Her first book, The Liberty Man, appeared while she was working as a secretary to the novelist Louis Golding. Her fictional diary, Nazi Lady: The Diaries of Elisabeth von Stahlenberg, 1938–48, was assumed by many to be real.

Early life
Born to Jewish parents, Dr Jack Freeman, a dentist who had been a physician, and his wife Freda (née Davids) in North London, she attended Francis Holland School in London and Lynton House school in Maidenhead during the Second World War. She graduated in English and philosophy from the University of Reading in 1951. She then taught at a school in the East End and worked as a copywriter and a newspaper reporter.

Career
The Liberty Man (1955) was Freeman's first book, written while working as a literary secretary to the novelist Louis Golding; it was about a love affair between a schoolteacher and a sailor doomed by the class system. Freeman's time with Golding was said to have inspired some of her later works.

One of her best known books was the novel The Leather Boys (1961), published under the pseudonym Eliot George, after the novelist George Eliot, a story of a gay relationship between two young working-class men, one married and the other a biker, which was later turned into a film for which she wrote the screenplay, this time under her own name. The novel was commissioned by the publisher Anthony Blond, her literary agent, who wanted a story about a "Romeo and Romeo in the South London suburbs". Her non-fiction book The Undergrowth of Literature (1967), was a pioneering study of pornography.

The Alabaster Egg (1970) is a tragic romance about a Jewish woman set in Nazi Germany. In 1978, on another commission from Blond, she wrote a fictional diary, Nazi Lady: The Diaries of Elisabeth von Stahlenberg, 1938–48. Freeman's authorship was not at first revealed and many readers assumed it was genuine; it was included in a 2004 anthology of war diaries.

In addition to novels, Freeman wrote screenplays including That Cold Day in the Park, a 1969 film directed by Robert Altman, the scenarios for two ballets by Kenneth MacMillan, Isadora and Mayerling, and with her husband, Ballet Genius (1988), portraits of 20 outstanding ballet dancers. Her final book was But Nobody Lives in Bloomsbury (2006), a fictional study of the Bloomsbury Group.

Private life
Freeman married Edward Thorpe, a novelist and the ballet critic of the Evening Standard, in 1955. The couple had two daughters, the actresses Harriet Thorpe and Matilda Thorpe.

She died on 23 February 2019 from complications of dementia.

Works
The Liberty Man, 1955
Fall of Innocence, 1956
Jack Would be a Gentleman, 1959
The Story of Albert Einstein, 1960
The Leather Boys, 1961
The Campaign, 1963
The Leather Boys (screenplay), 1964
Only Lovers Left Alive (screenplay), 1965
The Leader, 1965
The Undergrowth of Literature, 1967
That Cold Day in the Park (screenplay), 1969
An Evasion of Women (short play, alongside pieces by Shena Mackay, Margaret Drabble, and Maureen Duffy), 1969
The Alabaster Egg, 1970
I Want What I Want (screenplay), 1972
The Marriage Machine, 1975
The Schoolgirl Ethic: The Life and Work of Angela Brazil, 1976
Mayerling (ballet scenario), 1978
Intimate Letters (ballet scenario), 1978
Nazi Lady: The Diaries of Elisabeth von Stahlenberg, 1938–48, 1979
An Easter Egg Hunt, 1981
Isadora (ballet scenario), 1981
Lovechild, 1984
Life Before Man, 1986
Ballet Genius: Twenty Great Dancers of the Twentieth Century (with Edward Thorpe), 1988
Termination Rock, 1989
His Mistress's Voice, 2000
But Nobody Lives in Bloomsbury, 2006

References

External links
Listing of Gillian Freeman archives at Reading University Library

1929 births
2019 deaths
Alumni of the University of Reading

Pseudonymous women writers
British historical fiction writers
20th-century British women writers
21st-century British women writers
British women novelists
20th-century British novelists
21st-century British novelists
English Jews
British non-fiction writers
Deaths from dementia in England
20th-century pseudonymous writers
21st-century pseudonymous writers